A.S. Los Angeles is an American soccer team based in the Whittier, California that plays in the National Premier Soccer League.

History

A.S. Los Angeles was formed in 2018 under the name Los Angeles United FC. They announced they were joining the National Premier Soccer League for the 2019 season. They joined the league under the name A.S. Los Angeles.

Year-by-Year

References

2018 establishments in California
Association football clubs established in 2018
Soccer clubs in California
National Premier Soccer League teams
Soccer clubs in Greater Los Angeles